Protocolliuris coerulans is a species of beetle in the family Carabidae, the only species in the genus Protocolliuris.

References

Lebiinae